Walter Long may refer to:

Walter Long (1560/65–1610), English knight of South Wraxall and Draycot, Wiltshire, friend of Sir Walter Raleigh
Walter Long (c. 1594–1637), his son, English knight of Wiltshire
Sir Walter Long, 1st Baronet of Whaddon (c. 1603–1672), English MP for Ludgershal, prosecuted in the Star Chamber and imprisoned in the Tower of London
Sir Walter Long, 2nd Baronet of Whaddon (1627–1710), his son, English MP for Bath
Walter Long (MP 1701–02) (c. 1648–1731), English MP for Calne
Walter Long (of Preshaw) (1788–1871), English landowner of Preshaw, Hampshire
Walter Long (of South Wraxall) (c. 1712–1807), English Landowner of South Wraxall, Wiltshire
Walter Long (1793–1867), English landowner of Rood Ashton, Wiltshire and MP for North Wiltshire
Walter Long, 1st Viscount Long (1854–1924), British politician, MP, Secretary of State for the Colonies and First Lord of the Admiralty
Walter Long (British Army officer) (1879–1917), his son, British officer in the First World War
Walter Long, 2nd Viscount Long (1911–1944), his son, British peer and soldier
Walter Long (actor) (1879–1952), United States character actor, starred in Laurel and Hardy films
Walter Long (lieutenant) (1858–1892), British second lieutenant
Walter K. Long (1904–1986), artist, historian and contributor to the Mount Rushmore monument